William F. Patry (born January 1, 1950 in Niskayuna, New York) is an American lawyer specializing in copyright law. He studied at the San Francisco State University, where he obtained a B.A. in 1974 and an M.A. in 1976, and then at the University of Houston, where he graduated with a J.D. in 1980. He was admitted to the bar in Texas in 1981, in the District of Columbia in 2000, and in New York in 2001.

Biography
Patry served as a copyright counsel to the U.S. House of Representatives in the early 1990s, where he participated in the elaboration of the copyright provisions of the Uruguay Round Agreements Act. Patry also worked as a policy planning advisor to the Register of Copyrights, and held a post as Professor of Law at the Benjamin N. Cardozo School of Law.  He is also the author of an eight volume treatise on U.S. copyright law entitled Patry on Copyright. Patry is Senior Copyright Counsel at Google.

On August 1, 2008, Patry announced the termination of his blog, giving as reasons both the unwillingness of too many people to treat it as the personal blog that it was and the sad state of copyright law.

In 2009 he published Moral Panics and the Copyright Wars, and temporarily resumed blogging in support of the book.

Selected bibliography 

Books:

 
 
Patry, William F.: Patry on Copyright, Thomson West (Westlaw), 2007.
 
 

Papers:

Patry, W. F.: The Failure of the American Copyright System: Protecting the Idle Rich, 72 Notre Dame L. Rev. 907 (May 1997).

See also 
 Bridgeman Art Library v. Corel Corp.

References

External links
 Katz, A: Book review of Moral Panics and the Copyright Wars, in International Free and Open Source Software Law Review 2010. URL last accessed 2011-9-10
 Lung, G.: Book review of Patry on Copyright, in WIPO Magazine 4/2007. WIPO, 2007. URL last accessed 2007-09-11.
 Copycense: The William Patry Interview; interview with William Patry, 2007. URL last accessed 2007-09-11.
 The Patry Copyright Blog

Lectures
 Crafting an Effective Copyright Law Society for Computers and Law (UK) Annual Lecture 2009 (24 March 2009) (mp3)
Moral Panics and the Copyright Wars Intellectual Property Law Society, Benjamin N. Cardozo School of Law, NYC (12 October 2009) (mp4, mp3)
2009 Frey Lecture in Intellectual Property Duke University (Oct 21 2009)

American lawyers
Copyright scholars
1950 births
Living people
20th-century American Jews
21st-century American Jews